Yann Tiersen & Shannon Wright is a collaboration album between French musician Yann Tiersen and American singer and songwriter Shannon Wright.

Reception

Track listing
All lyrics are written by Shannon Wright. All music is composed by Yann Tiersen and Shannon Wright.

Personnel

Musicians
 Yann Tiersen – bass, violin, viola, piano, vibraphone, organ, cello, acoustic guitar, guitar, accordion, horns, marimba, electric piano
 Shannon Wright – vocals, guitar, drums, piano, electric piano, bass

Production
 Fabrice Laureau – recording and mixing
 Roger Seibel – mastering
 Artwork by Yann Tiersen, Shannon Wright, and others

Charts

References

2004 albums
Shannon Wright albums
Collaborative albums
Yann Tiersen albums